Itiji is an administrative ward in the Mbeya Urban district of the Mbeya Region of Tanzania. In 2016 the Tanzania National Bureau of Statistics report there were 4,663 people in the ward, from 4,231 in 2012.

Neighborhoods 
The ward has 4 neighborhoods.
 Itiji
 Makaburin
 Mbwile
 Mwasanga

References 

Wards of Mbeya Region